Yekaterina Olegovna Rudenko (born October 16, 1994) is a Kazakh swimmer, who specialized in backstroke events. She represented her nation Kazakhstan in two editions of the Olympic Games (2008 and 2012), finished fifth in the girls' 50 m backstroke at the 2010 Summer Youth Olympics in Singapore, and later captured two silver medals in the 50 and 100 m backstroke at the 2014 Asian Games in Incheon. 

Rudenko became the youngest ever swimmer (aged 13) to compete for the Kazakh team at the 2008 Summer Olympics in Beijing, swimming in the 100 m backstroke. She cruised to the top of the field with a 1:03.84 to invincibly slide under the FINA B-cut (1:03.86) by two hundredths of a second (0.02) at the Kazakhstan Open Championships three months earlier in Almaty. Inexperienced to the Olympic scene, Rudenko rounded out the field to last place and forty-fifth overall in heat two with a 1:04.85.

At the 2012 Summer Olympics, Rudenko competed for the second time in the women's 100 m backstroke, by downing her FINA B-cut to 1:02.60 at the Kazakhstan Open. Rudenko touched behind the leader Tao Li of Singapore on the initial length in heat two, before fading down the stretch to save the seventh spot in 1:03.64, missing the semifinals with a much improved, thirty-eighth overall placement in the prelims.

Two years later, at the 2014 Asian Games in Incheon, Rudenko upgraded her standards with a striking silver medal double in the women's 50 and 100 m backstroke, blistering a lifetime best of 28.04 (50 m backstroke) and 1:00.61 (100 m backstroke), respectively.

Rudenko is currently training for the Drury Panthers women's swimming and diving team under head coach Brian Reynolds, while taking up undergraduate studies at Drury University in Springfield, Missouri.

References

External links
Player Bio - Drury Panthers
Profile – Aquatics Kazakhstan
NBC Olympics Profile

1994 births
Living people
Kazakhstani female backstroke swimmers
Olympic swimmers of Kazakhstan
Swimmers at the 2008 Summer Olympics
Swimmers at the 2012 Summer Olympics
Swimmers at the 2016 Summer Olympics
Swimmers at the 2010 Summer Youth Olympics
Swimmers at the 2010 Asian Games
Swimmers at the 2014 Asian Games
Asian Games medalists in swimming
Drury Panthers women's swimmers
Sportspeople from Astana
Asian Games silver medalists for Kazakhstan

Medalists at the 2014 Asian Games